Euchromia irius is a moth of the subfamily Arctiinae. It was described by Jean Baptiste Boisduval in 1832. It is found on the Moluccas, Aru and New Guinea.

References

 

Moths described in 1832
Euchromiina